Cave World is the third studio album by Swedish post-punk band Viagra Boys. It was released on 8 July 2022, through YEAR0001.

Background and recording 
Cave World was written during the COVID-19 lockdowns, which serves a basis for much of the album, particularly with songs referring to hesitancy to COVID-19 vaccines. The album also was influenced by the origin of humans during the Paleolithic era (particularly cavemen), conspiracy theories, especially conspiracy theories and misinformation related to the COVID-19 pandemic, and QAnon supporters. Recording took place in winter 2021–22, during a break in touring in support of their previous album, Welfare Jazz.

Music and composition 
The album's music style was described by Ross Horton of The Line of Best Fit as a "heady brew of trad punk, post-punk, country and new wave and their look is a combination of unlicensed doorman menace and tracksuit couch slacker". Mark Tremblay described the album as a fusion of post-punk and new rave, and described some of the tracks as venturing into electronica.

"Big Boy" includes a guest appearance from Jason Williamson, vocalist of English band Sleaford Mods.

Critical reception 

Cave World was critically acclaimed by contemporary music critics upon release. On review aggregator website, Metacritic, Cave World has an average critic score of 81 out of 100, indicating "universal acclaim" based on seven critics. On AnyDecentMusic?, Cave World has an average score of 8.1 out of 10 based on ten contemporary music critic scores.

Alan Ashton-Smith of musicOMH awarded Cave World four-and-a-half stars out of five, summarizing the album as the best album of their career. Ashton-Smith described Cave World as "clever but debauched, silly but serious, this is the best album of their career thus far". Ross Horton, writing for The Line of Best Fit gave Cave World a 9 out of 10. Horton compared the album to the works of Iggy Pop and said that the album "is by some measure their most adventurous. Where the first (2018's Street Worms) was a note-perfect, hermetically-sealed recreation of old thrills, and the second (2021's Welfare Jazz) was an expansive and expanded take on the same source material, this one draws from a new well".

Ian Winwood, writing for Kerrang! gave Cave World four out of five stars, saying "Cave World is an album brimming not just with colour and life, but also with a sense of striking unease that is pitched somewhere between the deeply sexual and the profoundly sinister." Winwood gave specific praise to the tracks "Ain't No Thief", "Return to Monke", and "Creepy Crawlers". Laveia Thomas, of Clash praised the instrumentation on Cave World, particularly the use of the saxophone throughout the album. Thomas said that Cave World "paints rock'n'roll through a rose-tinted glass – distorted, warped and just completely fascinating". Thomas would go further to say that the band "have built their acclaim on the prefix that they're doing things differently, having built an army of fans from their projects, Viagra Boys weave in hints of electronica, intense bursts of sax, and angsty spoken-word vocals across this soaring new album".

P.J. McCormick, writing for Pitchfork offered a more mixed review of the album, giving it a 6.2 out of 10. Comparing their work to fellow Swedish band, The Hives, McCormick praised the production of the album saying that the album "production is cleaner than Viagra Boys’ first two albums, bringing their ever-present drive to the fore. The interplay of the rhythm section, vocal layering, and the occasional sax tear elides some of the weaker lyrics, and the album’s bass-forward gloss recalls Danger Mouse's back catalog of rock-oriented production work (Parquet Courts’ Wide Awake, The Black Keys' El Camino, Portugal. The Man's Woodstock). However, McCormick was critical of the album's critique of the alt-right, particularly saying "try as they might to curry offense by embodying the mindset of the alt-right internet troll, Cave World’s weaker moments recall a late-night television monologue: toothless, expendable, and not particularly interested in convincing the uninitiated."

Track listing

Personnel

Musicians
 Sebastian Murphy - vocals  (Tracks 1, 3, 4, 5, 6, 8, 9, 10, 12)
 Henrik Höckert - bass (Tracks 1, 3, 4, 5, 6, 8, 9, 10, 12), vocals (Track 1)
 Tor Sjöden - drums & percussion (Tracks 1, 3, 4, 5, 6, 8, 9, 12), vocals (Tracks 1, 9)
 Oscar Carls - saxophone & flute (Tracks 1, 3, 5, 6, 8, 9, 12), guitar (Tracks 3, 10) vocals (Track 1)
 Elias Jungqvist - keyboard (Tracks 1, 3, 4, 5, 6, 8, 9), piano (Track 9), vibraphone (Track 6), vocals (Tracks 1, 9)
 Linus Hillborg - guitar (Tracks 1, 3, 4, 5, 6, 8, 9, 10, 12), vocals (Track 1)
 Pelle Gunnerfeldt - guitar (Tracks 4, 6, 9, 10), keyboard (Tracks 4, 6, 8, 9, 10, 12), piano (Tracks 4, 6, 8, 9), vocals (Tracks 5, 6, 9)
 Fabian Berglund - drums (Track 5), turntable (Track 12)
 Jason Williamson - vocals (Track 9)

Production
 Fabian Berglund − producer (Tracks 2, 7, 11), engineer
 Pelle Gunnerfeldt − producer (all tracks), engineer, mixing
 Moa Romanova – artwork
 Robin Schmidt – mastering
 Johan Gustafsson – engineer
 Oscar Ulfheden – engineer

Charts

References

External links
 
 Cave Word Review @ Punktastic

2022 albums
Viagra Boys albums
Year0001 albums